The Virginia's 76th House of Delegates district elects one of 100 seats in the Virginia House of Delegates, the lower house of the state's bicameral legislature. District 76 is currently represented by Clint Jenkins.

District officeholders

References

External links
 

Virginia House of Delegates districts